Savinykh is a surmame of Russian origin. It may refer to :

 Danil Savinykh (born 2001), Russian football player
 Valeria Savinykh (born 1991), Russian tennis player
 Viktor Savinykh (born 1940), Russian cosmonaut
6890 Savinykh, minor planet named for the cosmonaut.